Mabel Balfour was a South African trade unionist and an anti-apartheid activist. Balfour was first involved with the unions representing food and canning workers. After many leaders in the South African Congress of Trade Unions (SACTU) were arrested in the 1956 Treason Trials, she became part of the Management Committee in 1957. Balfour was considered good at keeping "the spirits of workers high during very difficult times."

Balfour was arrested in 1958 for her participation in the April Stay-At Home and sentenced to £20 or 30-days hard labor for "inciting non-white workers on the Rand." The punishment was eventually suspended. In 1962, she became the General Secretary of the African Food and Canning Workers Union (A-FCWU) in Transvaal. She was banned in 1963 and confined to house arrest in Roodepoort.

See also 

 List of people subject to banning orders under apartheid

References

External links 
 Rita Ndzanga and Mabel Balfour

South African women activists
South African women trade unionists
Anti-apartheid activists